Lee Hyun-jin may refer to:

 Lee Hyun-jin (actor) (born 1985), South Korean actor
 Lee Hyun-jin (footballer) (born 1984), South Korean male football player